Loreto College, St Stephen's Green (sometimes referred to as Loreto on the Green) is a Catholic all-girls private school situated on St Stephen's Green in Dublin, Ireland. The school was founded at 58 Harcourt Street in 1833 as a convent and school by Mother Teresa Ball just after catholic emancipation. In 1841, the school moved to 53 St Stephen's Green.

Notable alumni

The school has had numerous notable alumni in the arts, sport, politics and religion.

The arts
 Beatrice Behan - artist and author
 Gemma-Leah Devereux - actor
 Maureen Charlton - poet, playwright and broadcaster

Politics
 Helena Concannon - historian and politician
 Eibhlín Nic Niocaill - gaelic league activist

References

Secondary schools in Dublin (city)
Private schools in the Republic of Ireland
Educational institutions established in 1833
Girls' schools in the Republic of Ireland
Catholic secondary schools in the Republic of Ireland
Sisters of Loreto schools